The Canterbury Bankstown Football Club is a soccer club based in Bankstown, New South Wales.

The club currently plays in the NSW League Two after being relegated from the formerly NPL NSW 2 in 2019.(from 2022 known as NSW League One)
Canterbury Bankstown hosts matches at The Crest Reserve in Bass Hill, Sydney.

History
They were one of the first football clubs formed in Sydney and competed in the first ever New South Wales State League as Canterbury FC, the club has also been known as Canterbury-Marrickville Olympic and West Sydney Berries; the "Berry" part of the name derives from Canter-"bury." Since that time, the club has enjoyed some years of success and also painful years of premiership droughts and grand final losses. The club played in the 1986 season of the National Soccer League.

Having been one of the bigger and more successful district clubs in Sydney, by the mid-1960s the club found itself in severe financial strife. A group of influential and disgruntled Pan-Hellenic (Sydney Olympic) members and supporters decided because of various disputes to leave and enquired about investing in the club. It was all agreed that Canterbury would sell a controlling stake of the club to this group of investors, who wanted to form the basis of a 2nd big Greek soccer club in Sydney to challenge Pan-Hellenic, later to be known as Canterbury-Marrickville Olympic Soccer Club.

In the mid-2000s the club had changed its name from Canterbury-Marrickville Olympic to West Sydney Berries to increase its appeal across South-western Sydney. It was the first time in the club's history club played without Canterbury in its name except for the period when they were known solely as Marrickville Olympic during the late 70's early 80's.

The club was chosen by Football NSW to be automatically promoted along with Macarthur Rams to the NSW Premier League for the 2008 NSWPL Season. The main reason for the club's inclusion was to strengthen football's presence in Western Sydney and also to have a starting post for a possible Western Sydney franchise in the A-League. The team had an unsuccessful return to the top-flight league in New South Wales. The team managed a lowly 10th place and narrowly escaped relegation from the NSW Premier League. In July 2008 the West Sydney Berries announced they had raised more than $32.000 for the hospital at Westmead.

After finishing last in the 2010 NSW Premier League season the club was relegated to the NSW Super League for the 2011 season, and for the 2012 NSW Super League season was known as Bankstown Berries FC and has since been renamed Canterbury Bankstown FC.

Johnny Warren, after whom Australian football's greatest prize, the Johnny Warren Medal is named is the best known personality of the history of the club. Alongside John Watkiss he participated in the World Cup 1974 in Germany. Graham Arnold, Charlie Yankos, goalkeeper Ron Corry, Peter Katholos, John Watkiss and Zlatko Arambasic are also Australian internationals who originated in the ranks of the club. Austrian legend, the former SK Rapid Wien player Leo Baumgartner belonged to the team with the Warren brothers, Watkiss and Corry that defeated Sydney FC Prague in the NSW grand-final of 1960 5–2.

Honours
NSW 1st Division Champions: 1957, 1958, 1960, 1985
NSW 2nd Division Champions: 1973
New South Wales State Division One/NSW Super League/NSW League One Winners: 2005
NSW State League Division two/NSW State League Division One/NSW League Two Champions: 2007

New South Wales State League Cup (Tiger Cup) Winners: 1946, 1947
Federation Cup Winners: 1957, 1958

References

External links
Canterbury Bankstown FC (Official Website)

New South Wales Premier League teams
Soccer clubs in Sydney
National Soccer League (Australia) teams
Association football clubs established in 1958
1958 establishments in Australia
Canterbury, New South Wales
Bankstown, New South Wales